Gatesville Municipal Airport  is a public airport located three miles (5 km) west of the central business district of Gatesville, a city in Coryell County, Texas, United States. This general aviation airport is owned by the City of Gatesville. It was formerly known as City-County Airport, at which time it was co-owned by Coryell County.

Although most U.S. airports use the same three-letter location identifier for the FAA and IATA, Gatesville Municipal Airport is assigned GOP (formerly 05F) by the FAA but has no designation from the IATA (which assigned GOP to Gorakhpur Airport in Gorakhpur, India).

Facilities and aircraft 

For the 12-month period ending February 19, 2003, the airport had 4,200 aircraft operations, 100% of which were general aviation.

References

External links 

Airports in Texas
Buildings and structures in Coryell County, Texas
Transportation in Coryell County, Texas